Iain Campbell (born 21 April 1965) is a British swimmer. He competed in two events at the 1984 Summer Olympics.  Representing Scotland, he won a bronze medal in the 4x100 medley relay at the 1982 Commonwealth Games.

References

External links
 

1965 births
Living people
Scottish male swimmers
British male swimmers
Olympic swimmers of Great Britain
Swimmers at the 1984 Summer Olympics
Swimmers at the 1982 Commonwealth Games
Commonwealth Games bronze medallists for Scotland
Commonwealth Games medallists in swimming
Sportspeople from Lagos
20th-century British people
Medallists at the 1982 Commonwealth Games